Robert H. Berry (January 23, 1905 – December 19, 1953) was an American football and track and field coach and college athletics administrator. He served two stints as the head football coach at East Texas State Teachers College—now known a Texas A&M University–Commerce—from 1935 to 1941 and 1946 to 1950, compiling a record of 72–34–8. Berry was also the track coach and athletic director at East Texas State.

Berry attended Texas A&M University, where he played college football as a quarterback in 1924 and 1925 before graduating in 1926. He was a second-team selection by the Associated Press to the 1925 All-Southwest Conference football team. Berry coached football and track at Paris Junior College in Paris, Texas for eight years before he was hired at East Texas State in 1935. Ge resigned from his post at East Texas State in 1951 to go into private business.

Berry moved to Johnson City, Tennessee and operated a dry cleaning business there. He was killed in a fire on December 19, 1953, at his home in Johnson City. He was believed to have died from smoke inhalation.

Head coaching record

College football

References

1905 births
1953 deaths
American football quarterbacks
Texas A&M Aggies football players
Texas A&M–Commerce Lions athletic directors
Texas A&M–Commerce Lions football coaches
College track and field coaches in the United States
Junior college football coaches in the United States
People from Johnson City, Tennessee
Deaths by smoke inhalation